William A. Greenlund (February 20, 1873 – August 23, 1935) was an American politician who served as the 33rd lieutenant governor of Ohio from 1913 to 1915 under Governor James M. Cox.

Biography

W. A. Greenlund was born in Titusville, Pennsylvania, February 20, 1873. His father was an immigrant from Denmark. W. A. was educated at public schools and high school in Pittsburgh, Pennsylvania. In 1891, he moved to Cleveland, Ohio and engaged in the real estate business.

In 1901, Greenlund married Burleigh M. Fritz of Cleveland. The only office he held before becoming lieutenant governor was as a Democratic State Senator from Cuyahoga County in the 80th General Assembly.

References

Lieutenant Governors of Ohio
1873 births
1935 deaths
Democratic Party Ohio state senators
Politicians from Cleveland
People from Titusville, Pennsylvania